The Veracruz salamander (Bolitoglossa veracrucis), also known as the Veracruz mushroomtongue salamander, is a species of salamander in the family Plethodontidae.
It is endemic to Mexico and known from southern Veracruz, north-eastern Oaxaca, and north-western Chiapas. Its natural habitats are tropical lowland forests, but it occurs also in disturbed habitats. It might be a habitat specialist of limestone outcrops. It is threatened by opening of its habitat by expanding agriculture and wood extraction.

References

Bolitoglossa
Endemic amphibians of Mexico
Petén–Veracruz moist forests
Taxonomy articles created by Polbot
Amphibians described in 1951